The 1950 Texas Western Miners football team was an American football team that represented Texas Western College (now known as University of Texas at El Paso) as a member of the Border Conference during the 1950 college football season. In its first season under head coach Mike Brumbelow, the team compiled a 7–3 record (4–2 against Border Conference opponents), finished third in the conference, and outscored all opponents by a total of 272 to 232.

Schedule

References

Texas Western
UTEP Miners football seasons
Texas Western Miners football